This list of works by Edwin Lutyens provides brief details of some of the houses, gardens, public buildings and memorials designed by Sir Edwin Landseer Lutyens (1869–1944).

Lutyens was a British architect known for imaginatively adapting traditional architectural styles to the requirements of his era. The architectural historian Gavin Stamp described him as "the greatest British architect of the twentieth (or of any other) century" and English Heritage identify him as "one of the greatest architects the country has ever produced". More than 500 of his creations have been placed on the National Heritage List for England.

United Kingdom

Houses and gardens

Bridges

Public buildings

Memorials

India
Lutyens was invited, with others, in 1912 to advise the Government of India on planning for a proposed new centre of government to be built in Delhi and named New Delhi. He became the project's leading architect, giving rise to Lutyens' Delhi, encompassing the street plan and key government buildings, and his name is lent to the Lutyens Bungalow Zone of domestic properties for government officers (albeit Lutyens was directly responsible for the design of only four of the houses). A number of other architects, notably Herbert Baker, were responsible for the city's other key buildings.

Ireland

France

Italy

South Africa

United States

Unrealised work

References

Edwin Lutyens